John William Counsell  (24 April 1905 – 23 February 1987) was an English actor, director and theatre manager, who (with his wife Mary Kerridge) ran the Theatre Royal, Windsor and its in-house repertory company from the 1930s to the 1980s. His daughter is the actress Elizabeth Counsell, and he was uncle to the actress and painter Jean Miller. Born in Beckenham, to Claud Counsell and Evelyn Fleming, the bulk of Counsell's career was spent in Windsor repertory theatre and the West End stage.

World War 2

He was the author of the German Instrument of Surrender document signed on 7 May 1945 which he wrote when he served as a colonel in the British Army during World War 2.

Theatre management

In 1930 Counsell served as an apprentice at the Theatre Royal in Windsor, Berkshire, when it reopened as a theatre after a short time as a cinema. In 1933 he took over managing the theatre; the venture lasted only a few months before it went bankrupt, but the future King George VI and Queen Elizabeth II attended one of the last performances, coming from nearby Windsor Castle.  Counsell re-opened the theatre in 1938 and was able to establish a viable company that ran without government subsidies.  He and his actress wife Mary Kerridge ran the theatre until his retirement in 1986, the year before his death.

John William Counsell was awarded the OBE in 1975 for services to the Theatre Royal in Windsor.

References

Further reading
 Counsell, John. "So Who Needs Subsidy, Anyway?", Scottish Theatre, Inverkeithing, Scottish Theatre, Vol.2 No.3, pp. 6–8 (May 1970)

External links 

 Theatre website
 History of the Theatre Royal, Windsor

1905 births
1987 deaths
Actor-managers
Officers of the Order of the British Empire
20th-century theatre managers